Anthene hades, the black ciliate blue, is a butterfly in the family Lycaenidae. It is found in Guinea-Bissau, Guinea, Sierra Leone, Liberia, Ivory Coast, Ghana, Togo, Benin, Nigeria (south and the Cross River loop), Cameroon, Gabon, the Democratic Republic of the Congo (Uele, Tshuapa, Equateur, Sankuru and Lualaba), Uganda, western Kenya and western Tanzania. The habitat consists of forests, open country in the forest zone and Guinea savanna.

Adults have been recorded feeding from flowers. Males are also known to mud-puddle.

References

Butterflies described in 1910
Anthene